Donald Roy Pettit (born April 20, 1955) is an American astronaut and chemical engineer. He is a veteran of two long-duration stays aboard the International Space Station, one Space Shuttle mission and a six-week expedition to find meteorites in Antarctica. As of 2022, at age 67, he is NASA's oldest active astronaut.

Early life and education
Pettit was raised in Silverton, Oregon, and is an Eagle Scout. He is married to Micki Pettit and has twin sons.

Pettit earned a Bachelor of Science degree in chemical engineering from Oregon State University in 1978, followed by a Ph.D. from the University of Arizona in 1983.

NASA career
Pettit worked as a scientist at the Los Alamos National Laboratory until 1996 when he was selected as an astronaut candidate by NASA. He was a junior advisor to the Synthesis Committee of the Space Exploration Initiative on its May 1991 report "America at the Threshold", recommending plans for a human mission to Mars.

Spaceflight experience

Expedition 6

Pettit's first space mission was as a mission specialist on ISS Expedition 6 in 2002 and 2003. During his six-month stay aboard the space station, he performed two EVAs to help install external scientific equipment.  During free time on his stay aboard the International Space Station, he conducted demonstrations showing how fluids react in an extremely low gravity environment in a series he called "Saturday Morning Science".

The Expedition 6 mission was extended by about two months, following the loss of the Space Shuttle Columbia in February 2003. Instead of returning on a shuttle the crew returned in a Russian Soyuz capsule, the first time American astronauts had launched on the Space Shuttle and landed in a Soyuz.

STS-126
Pettit was mission specialist 1 on the STS-126 mission to deliver equipment and supplies to the ISS.

Pettit also performed experiments on board ISS related to clumping of solid particles in microgravity.  The experiments showed that particles of various materials which varied in size between 1 micrometer and 6 mm naturally clumped together in microgravity when confined to a volume of 4 liters that included a few grams of the materials. The cause was theorized to be electrostatic. This presents a plausible mechanism for the initial stages of planetary formation, since particles of this size do not have sufficient gravity to cause this phenomenon.

Expedition 30/31
Pettit again launched to the International Space Station on December 21, 2011, as part of the Expedition 30/31 crew. He and fellow crewmembers Oleg Kononenko and André Kuipers arrived at the ISS on December 23.
Among his off-duty video demonstrations on the space station has been on water as thin film and the Marangoni convection.

On May 25, 2012, Pettit and Kuipers operated the Canadarm2 to grapple the SpaceX Dragon and berth it to the Harmony module.  Pettit was the first to enter the unmanned supply ship on May 26, making him the first astronaut in the history of space exploration to successfully enter a commercially-built and operated spacecraft berthed to the ISS in orbit.

Angry Birds Space Demos

During Expedition 30, on behalf of NASA in cooperation with Finland-based Rovio Entertainment, creator of the Angry Birds franchise, Pettit also made another video by using an Angry Birds character to explain how physics works in space, including demonstrating trajectories in microgravity by catapulting a Red Bird through the space station.

NASA states that such collaboration may share the excitement of space with the game community, educate users on NASA's programs, and create interactive educational experiences for the public.

The footage was released by NASA both on its official site and YouTube along with another commercial version by Rovio on March 8, 2012, to announce the launch of new game Angry Birds Space on March 22, 2012.

Inventions/innovations

During Expedition 6 in 2002/2003, Pettit used spare parts found throughout the Station to construct a barn door tracker; the device compensates for the movement of the ISS relative to the Earth's surface, permitting sharper high resolution images of city lights at night from the orbiting space station.

In November 2008, Pettit invented a zero-g coffee cup, which used the wetting angle to carry the coffee along a crease to permit drinking and avoid the necessity of a straw. This zero-g cup was featured in the May 2009 National Geographic Magazine issue, along with his notes on the relation of the internal cup angle to the contact wetting angle for various construction materials.

Antarctica

From November 2006 through January 2007, Pettit joined the Antarctic Search for Meteorites (ANSMET), spending six weeks in the Antarctic summer collecting meteorite samples, including a lunar meteorite.  During the expedition, he was called on to perform emergency electrical repairs to a snowmobile and emergency dental surgery.  Periods of tent-confining inclement weather were spent continuing his Saturday Morning Science series—"on Ice"—with photographic surveys of crystal sizes of glacial ice samples and collections of magnetic micrometeorites from ice melt used for cooking water. (He estimated Antarctic glacial ice to contain roughly 1 micrometeorite per liter.)

References

External links
 
 NASA Biography
 Don Pettit's Space Chronicles on Ice
 
 Don Pettit Oral History Interview

1955 births
Living people
American astronauts
Oregon State University alumni
University of Arizona alumni
People from Silverton, Oregon
Crew members of the International Space Station
Los Alamos National Laboratory personnel
Space Shuttle program astronauts
Spacewalkers